Alphabetum is a commercial multilingual Unicode font (TTF, TrueType font) for ancient languages developed by Juan José Marcos. It is also the prominent title of a Latin book printed in 1772 which describes the evolution of several Indian language scripts including that of Malayalam.

Alphabetum contains fonts for: 

Aegean numerals
Anatolian scripts (Lydian, Lycian, Carian, Phrygian, Sidetic)
Avestan
Brahmi
Celtiberian
Coptic (Bohairic)
Cypriot
Old Cyrillic
Old English 
Middle English
Glagolitic
Gothic
Ancient Greek
Ancient Greek acrophonic numerals
Ancient Greek  musical notation
Ancient Greek papyrological numbers
Hebrew
Iberian
New Testament editorial symbols
Old Italic (Etruscan, Oscan, Umbrian, Faliscan, Messapic, North and South Picene)
Kharosthi
Classical Latin 
Medieval Latin
Linear B
Old Nordic
Medieval Nordic
Ogham
Old Persian cuneiform
Phoenician
Runic
Sanskrit
Old Church Slavonic
Ugaritic

See also
 Unicode fonts
 List of Unicode characters

External links
 Alphabetum font home page. - Currently in version 14.00 (as of March 2020)

Unicode typefaces